Gramella echinicola is a Gram-negative and halophilic bacterium from the genus of Gramella which has been isolated from the sea urchin Strongylocentrotus intermedius from the Sea of Japan.

References

Flavobacteria
Bacteria described in 2005